Lemyra stigmata is a moth of the family Erebidae. It was described by Frederic Moore in 1865. It is found in China (Sichuan, Tibet, Yunnan, Shaanxi, Hubei), Pakistan, India (Himalayas, Sikkim, Assam, Arunachal Pradesh), Nepal, Bhutan, Myanmar, Thailand and Vietnam.

Subspecies
Lemyra stigmata stigmata (China: Sichuan, Tibet, Yunnan)
Lemyra stigmata aurantiaca (Fang, 1985) (Vietnam, China: Yunnan)

References

 

stigmata
Moths described in 1865